Lavender v. Kurn, 327 U.S. 645 (1946), was a case decided by the Supreme Court of the United States dealing with a negligent wrongful death case against a railroad employer under the Federal Employers Liability Act.  L.E. Haney was a switchtender who was killed at Grand Central Station in Memphis, Tennessee. He worked for both the Illinois Central and Frisco railroads.

The Missouri Supreme Court ordered a directed verdict in favor of the employer, claiming lack of evidence of negligence.  The Supreme Court overruled the State Supreme Court's ruling. The court held that there was sufficient evidence of negligence on the part of the defendants to justify the submission of the case to the jury and to require appellate courts to abide by the verdict rendered by the jury.

See also
 List of United States Supreme Court cases, volume 327
 Kohn v. McNulta

External links
 
 
 Lavender v. Kurn Case Brief at Lawnix.com
 Supreme Court of the United States

1946 in United States case law
United States Supreme Court cases
United States Supreme Court cases of the Stone Court
United States civil procedure case law
History of Memphis, Tennessee
Railway accident deaths in the United States
Illinois Central Railroad